Gallego may refer to:

 Gallego (surname)
 Galician language, the language spoken in northwestern Spain
 Gállego (river), a tributary of the Ebro, a river in the north of Spain
 Del Gallego, Camarines Sur, a municipality in the Philippines
 Gallego (footballer) or Francisco Fernández Rodríguez, Spanish football player
 The Galician Pony, also known as the Gallego horse, or Caballo de pura raza gallega
 A common Spanish and Portuguese name for Squalius carolitertii
 A common term in Latin America to refer to people from Spain or of Spaniard descent. This is sometimes used in a pejorative way.
 A person from Galicia, Spain.

See also
Gallegos (disambiguation)